Wellington Bartley Willoughby,  (August 10, 1859 – August 1, 1932) was a Canadian politician and lawyer.

He ran for a seat in the Dominion House of Commons for the Conservative Party in the 1895 election, but an unofficial Tory, William Stubbs backed by the Orange Order such as its Grand Master N.C. Wallace and McCarthyite leader Dalton McCarthy undermined his campaign, though he was also an Orangeman.

Willoughby served as leader of the Saskatchewan Conservative Party and leader of the opposition from 1912 to 1917 and was Member of the Legislative Assembly of Saskatchewan (MLA) for the city of Moose Jaw.

He resigned from the Saskatchewan legislature shortly after his re-election in the 1917 election in order to accept an appointment to the Senate of Canada by Sir Robert Borden.

In 1929, the leader of the federal Conservative Party, Richard Bennett, appointed Willoughby to the position of Leader of the Opposition in the Senate. When Bennett became Prime Minister of Canada following the 1930 federal election, Willoughby became Government Leader in the Senate and a minister without portfolio in the Canadian Cabinet.

Personal life 
Willoughby was born August 10, 1859 in Caledon, Ontario to John and Margaret Willoughby, two Episcopalian Methodists who worked as farmers. He had 7 siblings; William, who was 4 years older, Lydia, Samuel, Caroline, Wesley, John, and Margaret, who were all younger.

In October 1892, Wellington married Susan Thomas Jones of Germantown, Philadelphia. His wife would pass away June 27, 1907 of Endocarditis.

He died August 1, 1932 of throat cancer. He is buried at the Rosedale Cemetery in Moose Jaw, Saskatchewan.

References

External links
 
 http://canadianorangehistoricalsite.com/index-27.php

1859 births
1932 deaths
Canadian senators from Saskatchewan
Members of the King's Privy Council for Canada
Saskatchewan political party leaders
Progressive Conservative Party of Saskatchewan MLAs
Canadian Protestants